Peeping may refer to:

 Leaf peeping, observing autumn foliage
 Voyeurism, spying on intimate behaviors
 Scrying, a type of magical seeing

See also
 Peeping Tom (disambiguation)
 Peep (disambiguation)
 Peeper (disambiguation)